Møsvatn or Møsvann is a lake in Vinje Municipality in Vestfold og Telemark county, Norway. The lake lies just east of the Hardangervidda National Park, in Skien watershed (Skiensvassdrag) catchment area. The lake discharges into the Måna river at a dam located on the Vinje-Tinn municipal border (so a very small part of the lake crosses into Tinn Municipality too). The lake has an irregular shape with three arms.

From 1904 to 1906 dam was constructed and the lake was filled to begin hydroelectric power production.

Settlements
There are a few islands located in the lake. The main island of Hovdeøyi is the location of the village of Møsstrond where Møsstrond Church is located. There are several small, isolated farm communities located along the borders of the lake, most of which do not have road connections, so the main mode of transportation is by boat. Some of Norway's highest mountain farms can be found around the lake. The museum and visitor's centre Hardangervidda Natursenter is located close to the lake. Boat trips on the M/B Fjellvåken II can be taken from Skinnarbu to Mogen along the border with Hardangervidda. Along the shores of the lake, many traces of Stone Age settlers can be found.

History
On 19 November 1942, as part of the efforts to sabotage German heavy water production, glider-borne troops were to land on the frozen lake Møsvatn near the Vemork hydroelectric plant, run by Norsk Hydro, near the town of Rjukan. This effort was not successful; however ultimately the Norwegians stopped the heavy water production activities and helped limit the German nuclear weapons research program.

See also
List of lakes in Norway

References

Vinje
Lakes of Vestfold og Telemark